East Stockwith is a village within the civil parish of East Stockwith, in the West Lindsey district of Lincolnshire, England. The River Trent Aegir, a tidal bore, reaches the village. In 2001 it had a total resident population of 209, increasing to 314 at the 2011 census.

Opposite East Stockwith on the River Trent is West Stockwith, a large village within the county boundaries of Nottinghamshire. The two villages were once connected by a ferry which stopped in 1953.

The village contains a church, a pub, The Ferry House, and two large arable farms growing mainly wheat and potatoes. The nearest town with schools and shops is Gainsborough. Local leisure activities include angling on the Trent, particularly for eels, and horse riding.

References

External links

East Stockwith Parish Council
East Stockwith, My own page
East Stockwith  Aegir predictions

Villages in Lincolnshire
Civil parishes in Lincolnshire
West Lindsey District